Christian Faure may refer to:

 Christian Faure (cyclist) (born 1951), French cyclist
 Christian Faure (director) (born 1954), French screenwriter and film director